Meetic is a French online dating service founded in November 2001 and part of the Match Group since 2013.

History

In November 2001, Marc Simoncini started Meetic as a dating website. It became publicly quoted in October 2005.

In 2007, according to JupiterResearch, Meetic was the largest online dating service in Europe with 525,000 subscribers. The service's slogan was "Same game, new rules."

In 2013, Meetic was acquired by IAC and thus became a part of the leading Match Group. In December, Meetic launched the Stepout application where people can find out who likes them nearby.

Acquisitions
In February 2009, the company acquired the European activities of Match.com and grew to more than 30 million subscribers.

In December 2012, the Meetic Group bought Massive Media, the parent company of Twoo.com.

See also

 Timeline of online dating services
 Comparison of online dating services

References

Online dating services of France
Multilingual websites
Internet properties established in 2001
IAC (company)